Bridalveil Fall is one of the most prominent waterfalls in the Yosemite Valley in California. 

Geology

The glaciers that carved Yosemite Valley left many hanging valleys that spawned the waterfalls that pour into the valley. Most of the waterways that fed these falls carved the hanging valleys into steep cascades, however Bridalveil Creek still leaps into the valley from the edge of the precipice, although that edge has moved back into an alcove from the original edge of the valley. While Yosemite Falls seem to also fall into this category, the original course took the Yosemite Creek down a gorge to the west of its current location.

In a brisk wind, the falling water is often blown sideways, and when the flow is light, it may not reach the ground directly below. Because of this, the Ahwahneechee Native Americans called this waterfall "Pohono", which means "Spirit of the Puffing Wind".

See also
 Yosemite Firefall
 List of waterfalls

References

External links 

Story of Bridalveil Fall, Pohono Indian legend.

Geology of Yosemite National Park
Waterfalls of Yosemite National Park
Waterfalls of Mariposa County, California
Tourist attractions in Mariposa County, California
Plunge waterfalls